Tighina County may refer to:

Tighina County (Moldova)
Tighina County (Romania)